Roger Amuruz Gallegos (28 November 1958 – 18 October 2022) was a Peruvian engineer and politician. A member of Cambio 90, he served in the Democratic Constituent Congress from 1992 to 1995 and the Congress of the Republic from 1995 to 2000.

Amuruz died in Lima on 18 October 2022, at the age of 63.

References

1958 births
2022 deaths
Peruvian politicians
Peruvian engineers
Members of the Congress of the Republic of Peru
Members of the Democratic Constituent Congress
People from Madre de Dios Region